Mac Maoláin Gaelic-Irish surname.

Overview

Mac Maoláin was a surname borne by a number of unrelated families in Gaelic Ireland, anciently found in Breifne, Mide, Brega, Connacht and Ulster.

Now anglicised MacMullan, MacMullen, MacMoylan, McMullen, McMullan, McMellon, and McMullin, this name finds its origins as the collateral form of the root forenames: Maelan (pronounced Moylan); Maolain (pronounced Mullan) and Meallain (pronounced Mellan). The Irish form Mac (pronounced Mec=son of) Maoláin evolved primarily in the provinces of Connacht, Leinster and also in Ulster, where the influx of Scot Irish McMillan who adopted the Irish form McMullen makes separation of the native Irish difficult.

Mac Maoláin of Maigh Seóla

Maelan mac Cathmogha was king of Maigh Seóla (now part of County Galway) at his death in 848, claimed as an ancestor of the southern Ui Briuin family, though historians such as T. F. O'Rahilly thought the connection fictitious. The townland of Cluain Mhic Mhaolain (meadow of McMullan) in Roscommon immortalises the presence of a collateral surname family there.

Mac Maoláin of Gaileanga Brega

A sept of the Gailenga of Brega adopted the surname Mac Maoláin. The Annals of Ulster sub anno 1018 state "Maolán, mac Eccnígh uí Leochain, tigherna Gaileng & Tuath Luicchne (Luigne) uile, do mharbhadh dona Saithnibh" (Maolán, son of Eccnígh uí Leochain, king of Gaileng and all Luigne, was killed by the Saithne). In 1051, Laidcenn mac Maolain h-Uí Leocáin is listed as tigherna Gaileng (king of Gaileng), in 1076 the son of Mac Maolain is recorded in the round tower of Kells and in 1144, Mac Mic Maoláin, tigherna Gaileang Breagh ("the son of Mac Maoláin") was slain. Entries in the Book of Kells page 139 also reference Laidgnean Mac Moelan as laity (alumnus of columcille kells). The townland of Ballymullen alias Mc.Mullen Abbyleix (territory of O'Mhorda) is one of the lasting indications of this surname and presence of a collateral family in the province of Leinster.

Mac Maoláin Uíbh Echach

MacMullan and McMullen families are recorded in the Barony of Uíbh Echach (Clanna-Rory Irish Genealogical Foundation page 16), as Bishops of the Diocese of Connor and Down with the Bishops seat (the seat of MacMullen) identified as the townland of Cabra, parish of Clonduff, ancient territory of Mac Aenghusa (Magennis), Lords of Iveagh.

Noteworthy Mac Maoláins
 Billy McMillen, IRA Commander
 Ernan McMullin, American academic and educator
 Daniel McMullan, American activist and Human Welfare Commissioner

See also
McMullen
McMullan

References

 Clans and Families of Ireland and Scotland, by C. Thomas Cairney 
 History of Ireland in Maps 
 Irish Surname Development 
 Territory of the Gaileanga Mor Barony of Morgallion#cite note-1
 Clan Mac Maoláin Ireland http://www.macmaolain.com/
 Lebor Gabála Érenn
 Annals of the Four Masters
 Geoffrey Keating, 1636, Foras Feasa ar Eirenn

External links
 http://www.allfamilycrests.com/m/mcmullen-family-crest-coat-of-arms.shtml
 http://www.macmaolain.com/

Surnames
Irish families
Surnames of Irish origin
Irish-language surnames